State Route 328 (SR 328) is a north–south state highway in Roane and Morgan counties of East Tennessee. It connects the town of Oakdale to the cities of Harriman and Wartburg.

Route description

SR 328 begins in Roane County in downtown Harriman at an intersection with US 27/SR 61 (Roane Street/SR 29). It goes northwest along Georgia Street and immediately crosses a bridge over some railroad tracks before merging onto Oakdale Road. It passes through neighborhoods before running along the banks of the Emory River and passing through the Emory Gap through Walden Ridge. The highway then enters the Cumberland Plateau and leaves Harriman to cross into Morgan County. SR 328 winds its way north as Old Harriman Highway, running parallel to the Emory River, through rural areas to enter Oakdale and have an intersection with SR 299 just west of downtown. It then leaves Oakdale and the Emory River and winds its way north through mountains and rural areas of the Cumberland Plateau before coming to an end at an intersection with US 27/SR 29.

History

SR 328 was once designated as State Route 29A (SR 29A).

Major intersections

References

328
Transportation in Roane County, Tennessee
Transportation in Morgan County, Tennessee